A total solar eclipse will occur on Monday, May 1, 2079, with a maximum eclipse at 10:48:25.6 UTC (10:50:12.8 TD). A solar eclipse occurs when the Moon passes between Earth and the Sun, thereby totally or partly obscuring the image of the Sun for a viewer on Earth. A total solar eclipse occurs when the Moon's apparent diameter is larger than the Sun's, blocking all direct sunlight, turning day into darkness. Totality occurs in a narrow path across Earth's surface, with the partial solar eclipse visible over a surrounding region thousands of kilometres wide.
The eclipse will be visible in Greenland, parts of eastern Canada (including Newfoundland and Labrador, New Brunswick, Nova Scotia and Prince Edward Island) and parts of the northeastern United States (including Maine, New Hampshire, Vermont, Connecticut, Rhode Island, Massachusetts, New York, Pennsylvania and New Jersey).

Visible cities 
The Path of totality will start in eastern Pennsylvania. A total eclipse will be visible along the path of Philadelphia, New York City, Boston and Portland in the United States. Partial eclipses will be visible in Charlotte, Richmond, Cleveland, Detroit, Chicago, Washington, D.C., and Buffalo. In Canada, the total eclipse can be visible in Halifax, and St. John, while the partial eclipse can be seen in Montreal, Toronto, Ottawa, and most of northern Canada. The path then passes directly through Nuuk, making it visible to most of Greenland. The path will end near the Bering Strait. a partial eclipse can be visible in a very small part of South America, Northern Africa, Europe and Northern Asia (Mostly Russia).

Details 

Delta T: 1 minute, 47.3 seconds

Magnitude = 1.05116

Obscuration = 1.10494

Gamma = 0.90808

Greatest eclipse = 01 May 2079 10:48:25.6 UTC (10:50:12.8 AT)

Sun right ascension = 2 hours, 35 minutes, 18.8 seconds

Sun declination = 15 degrees, 12 minutes, 6.8 seconds north of the celestial equator

Moon right ascension = 2 hours, 33 minutes, 47.0 seconds

Moon declination = 16 degrees, 2 minutes, 36.5 seconds north of the celestial equator

Sun diameter = 1905.2 arcseconds

Moon diameter = 1989.4 arcseconds

Path width at greatest eclipse = 405.7 km (252.1 mi)

Path width at greatest duration = 404.8 km (251.5 mi)

Totality at greatest eclipse = 2 minutes, 54 seconds, 910 milliseconds

Totality at greatest duration = 2 minutes, 54 seconds, 920 milliseconds

Related eclipses

Solar eclipses 2076–2079

Saros 149

Inex series 

In the 19th century:
 Solar saros 140: total solar eclipse of October 29, 1818
 Solar saros 141: annular solar eclipse of October 9, 1847
 Solar saros 142: total solar eclipse of September 17, 1876

In the 22nd century:
 Solar saros 150: partial solar eclipse of April 11, 2108
 Solar saros 151: annular solar eclipse of March 21, 2137
 Solar saros 152: total solar eclipse of March 2, 2166
 Solar saros 153: annular solar eclipse of February 10, 2195

Tritos series

Metonic series 
 All eclipses in this table occur at the Moon's ascending node.

Notes

References

2079 05 01
2079 in science
2079 05 01
2079 05 01